GKS Bełchatów  is a Polish professional football club based in Bełchatów that currently plays in the IV liga.

History 

GKS Bełchatów entered Poland's Klasa A in 1977 under the name of Węgiel Brunatny Bełchatów, and gained promotion to the III liga in the 1981–82 season. It took the club another seven years to rise to the II liga (1986/1987 season), before winning a place in the top-tier I liga in 1992. After another spell in II liga, the club again won promotion to the I liga at the end of the 2004–05 season. The club finished the 2005–06 season in 10th place, with 37 points. The following season they challenged for the league title. After spending much of the latter part of the 2006–07 season in first place, they were ultimately overtaken by Zagłębie Lubin and had to settle for second place.

On 11 March 2022, the club, then playing in the II liga, withdrew from the league and did not start playing in the spring round. As a consequence, they were moved to the last place in the 2021–22 season standings and their remaining matches being declared 0–3 forfeits for their opponents. On 31 May 2022, the Łódź voivodeship admitted the academy of GKS Bełchatów to the Łódź group of IV liga for the 2022–23 season.

Achievements 
 Ekstraklasa (First division):
2nd place (1): 2007
 Polish Cup:
Finalist (2): 1996, 1999
 Ekstraklasa Cup:
Finalist (1): 2007
Polish SuperCup:
Finalist (1): 2007

Fans and rivalries
The fans are called Torfiorze (the "Turfers" in translation). They have friendly relations with fans of Wisła Sandomierz. Their biggest rivals are neighbours RKS Radomsko, and as Bełchatów is located in the Łódź Province, they also have rivalries with the two traditional well-established Łódź teams, ŁKS and Widzew.

Bełchatów in Europe

Current squad

Out on loan

Managers 

  Wlodzimierz Tylak (March 7, 1992 – June 20, 1993)
  Wladyslaw Lach (July 1, 1993 – Aug 31, 1995)
  Krzysztof Pawlak (Sept 1, 1995 – June 30, 1996)
  Janusz Bialek (July 27, 1996 – Sept 21, 1996)
  Marek Pochopień (Sept 28, 1996 – Dec 31, 1996)
  Bogusław Kaczmarek (March 5, 1997 – May 14, 1997)
  Jerzy Wyrobek (May 17, 1997 – June 30, 1998)
  Krzysztof Pawlak (July 1, 1998 – May 9, 1999)
  Marek Pochopień (May 10, 1999 – June 30, 1999)
  Orest Lenczyk (1999)
  Krzysztof Wolak (1999–2000)
  Ryszard Polak (2000)
  Jan Złomańczuk,  Piotr Szarpak &  Adam Mażysz (May 9, 2000 – April 22, 2001)
  Józef Dankowski (2001)
  Krzysztof Tochel (Oct 2001 – May 2)
  Jacek Zieliński (June 11, 2002 – Sept 10, 2002)
  Mariusz Kuras (Sept 11, 2002 – Oct 6, 2005)
  Orest Lenczyk (Oct 10, 2005 – March 21, 2008)
  Jan Złomańczuk (interim) (March 21, 2008 – May 21, 2008)
  Paweł Janas (May 21, 2008 – Jan 3, 2009)
  Rafał Ulatowski (2009 – May 24, 2010)
  Maciej Bartoszek (June 2, 2010 – June 30, 2011)
  Paweł Janas (June 17, 2011 – Aug 31, 2011)
  Kamil Kiereś (Sept 1, 2011 – Sept 25, 2012)
  Jan Złomańczuk (Sept 25, 2012 – Nov 14, 2012)
  Michal Probierz (Nov 14, 2012 – Dec 21, 2012)
  Kamil Kiereś (Jan 9, 2013–2015)
  Marek Zub (2015)
  Kamil Kiereś (2015)
  Rafał Ulatowski (2015–2016)
  Krystian Kierach (interim) (2016)
  Andrzej Konwiński (2016)
  Mariusz Pawlak (2017–2018)
  Artur Derbin (2018–2020)
  Marcin Węglewski (2020–2021)
  Patryk Rachwał (2021)
  Kamil Socha (2021–2022)
  Bogdan Jóźwiak (2022–)

Notable players 
Players who have been capped and/or have over 80 appearances for the club	
  Carlo Costly
  Dainius Suliauskas
  Łukasz Garguła
  Jacek Krzynówek
  Radosław Matusiak
  Grzegorz Rasiak
  Łukasz Sapela

References

External links 
Official club website
GKS Bełchatów at Soccerway

 
Association football clubs established in 1977
1977 establishments in Poland
Bełchatów